The KR-b men's basketball team, commonly known as KR-b or KR Bumban, is the reserve team of KR men's basketball, based in Reykjavík, Iceland. It currently plays in the 2. deild karla and the Icelandic basketball cup. Despite the teams reserve status, it regularly features high profile players during the Icelandic basketball cup.

Notable players

References

External links
Official Website
KR profile  on Icelandic Basketball Association

KR (basketball)
Sport in Reykjavík
Knattspyrnufélag Reykjavíkur